LiuGong, officially Guangxi LiuGong Machinery Co., Ltd., is a Chinese multinational
construction machinery manufacturing company headquartered in Liuzhou, China. It is the world's 10th-largest construction equipment manufacturer by market share and the world's largest manufacturer of wheel loaders.

LiuGong was founded in 1958 in Liuzhou. Its products include wheel loaders, bulldozers, skid steer loaders, forklifts, motor graders, excavators, long reach excavators, rollers, truck mounted and crawler cranes, pavers, mini excavators, drilling machines, mining dump trucks, concrete equipment, and cold planners. It is listed on the Shenzhen Stock Exchange.

History
LiuGong manufactured China's first modernized wheel loader in 1966 and in 1976 produced its first articulated and oversized wheel loaders. In 1993, it became China's first publicly traded construction equipment company. Then, to take advantage of western technologies, it entered into a joint venture with the German transmission manufacturer ZF in 1995, a partnership that continues today. In 2000, LiuGong acquired Jiangyin Roller Company, and soon after, continued to expand its product offering to include a total of 12 different product lines. These lines include a full array of construction equipment and specialized machines such as materials handling equipment and mobilized cranes.  Today, LiuGong offers 19 different product lines.

In February 2012 LiuGong acquired Huta Stalowa Wola construction machines division and Dressta Co, Ltd. in Stalowa Wola, Poland.

Operations

LiuGong employs over 11,000 people worldwide, and has 24 manufacturing facilities and around 2,650 sales outlets and 380 dealers. Supporting its dealer network are 10 regional offices with engineering, marketing, and service support, coupled with 10 parts depots located worldwide. LiuGong has subsidiary companies based in Johannesburg, South Africa; Sydney, Australia; Belo Horizonte, Brazil; Dubai; Europe; New Delhi, India; Stalowa Wola, Poland; Singapore; Moscow, Russia; and Houston, United States.

Joint ventures

Guangxi Cummins Industrial Power
On 20 October 2011 LiuGong and Cummins Inc. signed a joint-venture agreement to build a new mid-range engine manufacturing facility in Liuzhou, Guangxi Province, southern China. The joint-venture, named Guangxi Cummins Industrial Power Co., Ltd., was planned to commence production of engines meeting Tier 2 and Tier 3 emissions by 2013. The engines will be fully localized in China. They have developed a new 9.3-Liter engine, and it is scheduled for production soon.

Liuzhou ZF Machinery
Liuzhou ZF Machinery Co., Ltd. is a joint venture between LiuGong (49%) and ZF Friedrichshafen of Germany (51%) which manufactures driveline and parts of driveline for construction machinery. Ratified by the People's Government of Guangxi, both shareholders signed the JV Contract in the Great Hall of the People, Beijing, on 12 December 1995, and the business license was approved in the same year.

Beijing Capital Steel Heavy Duty Truck
LiuGong holds a 42% stake in Beijing Capital Steel Heavy Duty Truck Co. Ltd, which is a subsidiary of Beijing Capital Steel Mining Co. The terms of the acquisition of the stake were not disclosed.

Products
LiuGong's products include wheel loaders, bulldozers, skid steer loaders, forklifts, motor graders, excavators, rollers, truck mounted and crawler cranes, pavers, mini excavators, drilling machines, mining dump trucks, concrete equipment, and cold planners.

See also
Caterpillar Inc
Cummins

References

External links

 LiuGong official site
 LiuGong Argentine Reseller site

Companies listed on the Shenzhen Stock Exchange
Construction equipment manufacturers of China
Multinational companies headquartered in China
Companies based in Guangxi
Manufacturing companies established in 1958
Chinese brands
1958 establishments in China
Diesel engine manufacturers
Automotive transmission makers
Mining equipment companies
Engine manufacturers of China